Şimşek is a Turkish surname meaning "lightning" and may refer to:

 Beykan Şimşek (born 1995), Turkish footballer
 Emre Şimşek (born 1987), Turkish alpine skier
 Hikmet Şimşek (1924–2001), Turkish conductor of Western classical music 
 Kenan Şimşek (born 1968), Turkish Olympian sport wrestler and oil wrestler
 Mehmet Şimşek (born 1967), Turkish politician and government minister
 Olgun Şimşek (born 1971), Turkish actor
 Rıdvan Şimşek (born 1991), Turkish footballer
 Sibel Şimşek (born 1984), Turkish female weightlifter
 Yavuz Şimşek (born 1975), Turkish footballer
 Yusuf Şimşek (born 1947), Turkish footballer
 Zeliha Şimşek (born 1981), Turkish women's footballer and coach

See also
 TAI Şimşek, Turkish high-speed target drone

Turkish-language surnames